Mark of Cornwall was a sixth-century King of Kernow (Cornwall), possibly identical with King Conomor. He is best known for his appearance in Arthurian legend as the uncle of Tristan and the husband of Iseult who engages with Tristan in a secret liaison, giving Mark the epithet "Cuckold King".

King Mark

In Old Welsh records, Mark is recorded as "March son of Meirchion" of Kernow (Cornwall). He is associated with governing portions of Gwynedd and Glamorgan in Wales. Mark has been identified with Conomor, a king of Domnonea and Kernev (Domnonée and Cornouaille) in Armorica.

In his Life of St. Pol de Leon, Wrmonoc of Landévennec refers to a "King Marc whose other name is Quonomorus". Also rendered as Cunomorus, the name means "Hound-of-the-sea".

An inscription on a sixth-century gravestone near the Cornish town of Fowey memorializes (in Latin) a "Drustanus son of Cunomorus", and it has been thought that this is the "Tristan son of Mark (alias 'Quonomorus')" of legend. It has a mid-6th-century, two-line inscription which has been interpreted as DRVSTANVS HIC IACIT CVNOWORI FILIVS ("Drustan lies here, of Cunomorus the son"). A now-missing third line was described by the 16th-century antiquarian John Leland as CVM DOMINA OUSILLA ("with the lady Ousilla"). Ousilla is a Latinisation of the Cornish female name Eselt. The stone led to Mark's association with Castle Dore.

Legend
In most versions of the story of Tristan and Iseult, King Mark of Cornwall is Tristan's uncle. His sister is Tristan's mother, Blancheflor (also known as Elizabeth or Isabelle). In some later versions he is related to Tristan's father, Meliadus.

Mark sends Tristan as his proxy to bring his young bride, Princess Iseult, from Ireland. Tristan and Iseult fall in love and, with the help of a magic potion, have one of the stormiest love affairs in medieval literature. Mark suspects the affair, and his suspicions are eventually confirmed. In some versions he sends for Tristan to be hanged, and banishes Iseult to a leper colony. Tristan escapes the hanging, and rescues Iseult from her confinement. Mark later discovers this, and eventually forgives them; Iseult returns to Mark, and Tristan leaves the country. The story is cyclical, with Mark repeatedly suspecting Tristan and Iseult of adultery and then believing that they are innocent. In Béroul's version, Tristan and Iseult are never in grave danger; the narrator declares that he and God are on their side. Mark, as a husband and king, is not idealized like other Arthurian kings; his ties to the story are personal.

Marie de France's Breton lai Chevrefoil (sometimes known as The Lay of the Honeysuckle) tells part of the Tristan and Iseult tale. The lai begins with an explanation of Mark's fury at the affair of Tristan and Isoude, which leads Mark to banish Tristan from Cornwall. Tristan spends a year pining for Isoude in South Wales until his sorrow drives him to secretly return to Cornwall. Hiding in the woods and sheltering with villagers at night, Tristan hears that Mark plans to hold a Pentecost feast with Isoude. Tristan knows that the queen will ride through the forest to get there. He determines her most-likely path, and places on the trail a stripped hazel stick with a carving of his name on it. Isoude recognizes the sign and, stopping her party to rest, she and her maid Brangwaine leave to find Tristan. During the illicit meeting, Isoude helps Tristan with a plan to win back Mark's favor. Marie ends the poem with a revelation that the lai Tristan composed was called "Goatleaf" in English ("Chèvrefeuille" in French), and the lai he composed was the one the reader just finished.

In the Prose Tristan, Mark is the son of king Felix and his character deteriorates from a sympathetic cuckold to a villain; he rapes his niece and murders her when she produces his son, Meraugis. Mark also murders his brother, Prince Boudwin, and later kills Boudwin's vengeful teenage son Alisander (Alisuander, Alexander) the Orphan. In earlier variants of the story, Tristan dies in Brittany far from Mark; in the Prose Tristan, however, Tristan is mortally wounded by Mark while he plays the harp under a tree for Iseult. This version of Mark was popular in other medieval works, including the Romance of Palamedes and Thomas Malory's Le Morte d'Arthur. In these texts, Mark usually rules Cornwall from Tintagel Castle, is often an enemy of Arthur's jester knight Dinadan, and (as in the Post-Vulgate Cycle) even destroys Camelot after the death of Arthur. Malory's version says that Alisander's son eventually avenges his father and grandfather, presumably by killing Mark.

Horse ears
Mark has become associated with a Celtic variant of the story of Midas and his donkey ears from Greek mythology, due to a pun on marc (a Celtic word for "horse"). The story occurs in Tristan by the 12th-century French poet Béroul, where a dwarf reveals that "Mark has horse's ears" to a hawthorn tree in the presence of three lords.

According to a Breton tale published in 1794, Mark was initially the king of Cornouaille, France, and was seated at Ploumarch (Portzmarch). The king kills every barber who knows the secret about his ears except one, who tells the secret to the sand (or wind). Reeds grow from that spot, which are harvested to make reeds for the oboe (or, simply, pipes). When the instruments are played, the music seems to say that the king has horse's ears. John Rhys recorded a Welsh tale similar to the simpler Breton version.

An embellished 1905 version, collected by Yann ar Floc'h, blends the legend of Ys with the premise that Mark was condemned by Gradlon's daughter  (or Dahut). Mark tried to hunt her when she assumed the guise of a doe, and had his ears exchanged for those of his prized horse Morvarc'h.

Modern culture
King Mark has a gruesome role in Alfred, Lord Tennyson's poetry cycle Idylls of the King. While Arthur and many of his knights are taking on the court of the Red Knight, Lancelot is called upon to judge "The Tournament of the Dead Innocence." The tournament quickly becomes a mockery, full of insults and broken rules. Tristram (Tristan) is the winner of the tournament, winning all the rubies from the necklace. He then breaks with tradition in presenting them to a woman, saying: "This day my Queen of Beauty is not here". This enrages the crowd, and many say that "All courtesy is dead," and "The glory of our Round Table is no more." Tristram, who in this version marries Isolt of the White Hands, carries his winnings to Mark's wife Queen Isolt (who is upset that Tristram married another woman). They mock each other briefly before Tristram puts the necklace around Isolt's neck and leans down to kiss her. Mark appears as his lips touch her, killing Tristram with a sword.
Mark (the German "Marke") is a character in Wagner's 1859 opera, Tristan und Isolde, where the role was first sung by the bass Ludwig Zottmayer.
In the 1954 film The Black Knight, he is depicted by Patrick Troughton as a pagan trying to overthrow Christianity and King Arthur.
In the 1970s TV show Arthur of the Britons, Mark was played by Brian Blessed.
In 1981 film Lovespell, King Mark was played by Richard Burton.
Mark (called "Marc'h of Kernow") is a character in Diana L. Paxson's 1988 novel, The White Raven. The novel is of Paxson's take on the Tristan and Iseult story from the point of view of Iseult's cousin, Branwen.
In Bernard Cornwell's 1996 novel Enemy of God (part of his The Warlord Chronicles series), King Mark is a physically- and morally-monstrous tyrant who murders his young wife every few years to marry another. When Mark's newest teenage wife (Iseult) flees with his young son Tristan, the fugitive lovers take refuge in Mordred's kingdom of Dumnonia under the regency of Tristan's friend, Arthur. Arthur allows Mark to arrive with his soldiers, and has the prince killed and the queen burned at the stake. Mark later dies from a horrible illness.
In the 2006 film Tristan & Isolde, Marke was played by Rufus Sewell. He adopts Tristan as his son after the death of the boy's parents, who loyally supported Marke's plans to unite Britain. Marke is portrayed as a good ruler and a kind husband to Isolde (unaware that she has already fallen for Tristan), and is confused by his adopted son's unhappy, distanced behaviour. When Tristan and Isolde are caught embracing, Marke feels angry and betrayed; he relents after hearing the story of their meeting and lets them leave together, although Tristan insists on staying to stand against Marke's enemies. After Tristan is mortally wounded in battle, Marke returns him to Isolde for his last moments and then  unites Britain.

Notes

References
Citations

Bibliography

External links

Mark at The Camelot Project

6th-century English monarchs
Arthurian characters
Legendary British kings
Tristan and Iseult
Monarchs of Cornwall